Newtown Castle is a 16th-century tower house, located close to the village of Ballyvaughan within the Burren area of County Clare, Ireland. Uniquely for a tower house of its type in Ireland, Newtown Castle is mostly cylindrical in shape but rises from a square pyramidical base. It is today part of the Burren College of Art.

History
Newtown Castle was likely built circa 1550 for the O'Brien clan. In the Forfeitures and Distribution books of 1641 it was listed as property of Donogh O'Brien. However, Newtown Castle soon passed into possession of the O'Lochlainn (or O'Loghlen) family, the most powerful clan of the area. The Ordnance Survey of 1839 names Charles O'Loghlen as inhabitant of the castle and describes the tower as being in good repair. Charles O'Loghlen was locally known as the "King of the Burren".

In 1848, the landlord, the then Marquess of Buckingham who had been bankrupted sold the local lands.

At the time of the Griffith's valuation in the 1850s, the building next to the castle, erected in about 1820, was a rectory inhabited by the Reverend Hugh B. Howlett.

At the end of the 19th century Peter O'Loghlen lived in the castle. He was referred to as the "Prince of the Burren".

During reconstruction (see below) limited excavations were conducted at Newtown Castle. The results indicated that the castle may be late 16th or early 17th century, rather than mid-16th century. Signs of the presence of a significant population (animal and shellfish remains and a large cobbled space) were also discovered in the area. This gave rise to speculation whether the name "Newtown" may actually have referred to a new settlement near the castle.

Architecture
Newtown Castle is one of only a few cylindrical tower houses in the area. In all of Ireland, only around 30 of the roughly 3,000 tower houses are round. In addition, Newtown Castle features an unusual pyramidical base, which makes it unique in all of Ireland.

The tower has four upper floors. The ground floor and first floor feature vaulted ceilings. There are gun-loops on the first floor. A doorway at second-floor level may have connected with a long vanished adjacent building. These features and the mouldings of the windows point to a sixteenth-century date. The tower was restored for use as the Burren College of Art with a conical oak roof and opened in July 1994 by Mary Robinson.

Today
Newtown Castle was restored in 1993–94 for use by the newly established Burren College of Art, which was opened by president Mary Robinson in 1994. It is available as a venue for weddings and conferences. The castle is located on the Burren Way, a long distance trail. The castle is in the townland of Newton, parish of Drumcreehy.

The tower is open to the public on weekdays.

References

 George Cunningham: Burren Journey. Shannonside. Limerick 1978.
 George Cunningham: Burren Journey West. Shannonside. Limerick 1980.
 Mary Hawkes Greene: The Burren College of Art — from Dream to Reality in: Sarah Poyntz (ed.), Burren Villages — Tales of History and Imagination. Cork 2010.
 Peter Harbison: Guide to National and Historic Monuments of Ireland. 3rd edition. Gill & Macmillan Publ., Dublin 1992, .
 Anne Korff: The Burren. A Ramblers Guide & Map. Ballyvaughan. Clodori Lurgan Teo, Kinvara 1986, ISSN 0790-8911.

External links
 Newtown Castle at the Landed Estates Database
 Castle website
 Burren College of Art website
 Description in Autumnal Rambles about New Quay, County Clare
 Description in County Clare: A History and Topography, 1837, by Samuel Lewis

Castles in County Clare